Topli Do is a village in the municipality of Surdulica, Serbia. According to the 2002 census, the village has a population of 53 people.

References

Populated places in Pčinja District